The Television and Radio Industries Club (widely known as TRIC) is a British institution chartered in 1931 to "promote goodwill in the television and radio industries". The Club holds an annual awards ceremony each March honouring achievement in television and radio.

Membership is drawn from the communication, entertainment, manufacturing, warranty insurance and service sectors from programme makers and broadcasters to radio producers and makers.

TRIC president 
The TRIC presidency is an honorary position that usually has a fixed term of one year. For the first few decades of its existence, TRIC presidents were drawn mainly from TV/Radio industry pioneers or the world of politics. The 1970s heralded a shift and marked a period which saw the appointment of numerous broadcast industry executives. The 1990s saw another shift with appointments from the world of popular entertainment. Notable holders have included Robert Maxwell, Michael Grade, Bob Monkhouse, Bernard Ingham and Tony Hadley

1980–present day

1940–1979

1930s 
1939-40: The Right Honourable J. H. Thomas

1938-39: Major L. H. Peter (Chairman of the Radio Manufacturers Association and Chief engineer, Westinghouse Brake and Signal Company)

1937-38: M. M. Macqueen (Chairman of the Radio Manufacturers Association and later Chairman of General Electric Company)

TRIC Awards

Traditionally, the annual awards ceremony has taken place at the Grosvenor House Hotel, London, ever since the first Awards Lunch was held there in April 1969 when three awards were presented to Val Doonican, Kenneth Horne and The Forsyte Saga. In 2021 due to COVID restrictions the awards were presented in September instead of their usual March fixture and at 8 Northumberland Avenue near Trafalgar Square with an accompanying livestream.

Since 1992 it has been the honour of the TRIC president to host the awards ceremony, the only recent exceptions being the 2009 ceremony when Bill Turnbull stepped in on behalf of Sian Williams who was on maternity leave, and 2021 when Roman Kemp hosted in lieu of then president John Barrowman.

Award winners from the twentieth century have included sports presenter David Coleman, newscaster Jan Leeming and long-running radio drama, The Archers.

2022 winners

2021 winners

2020 winners

2019 winners

2018 winners

2017 winners

2016 winners

2015 winners

2014 winners

2013 winners

2012 winners

2011 winners

2010 winners

2009 winners

2008 winners

2007 winners

2006 winners

2005 winners

2004 winners

2003 winners

2002 winners

2001 awards

2000 awards

1999 awards

References

External links
The Television and Radio Industries Club

1931 establishments in the United Kingdom
Television organisations in the United Kingdom
Organizations established in 1931
British television awards